Nicholas Viscardi (October 20, 1920 – November 3, 2013), known professionally as Nick Cardy and Nick Cardi, was an American comics artist best known for his DC Comics work on Aquaman, the Teen Titans and other major characters. Cardy was inducted into the Will Eisner Comic Book Hall of Fame in 2005.

Early life
Nick Cardy was born Nicholas Viscardi on October 20, 1920, in New York City. He began drawing when he was very young, telling one interviewer that some paintings he had done for his school were "published in the [New York] Herald-Tribune or one of those early papers. The teachers wanted one on sports. It was a 4 × 8 panel. ... So that was published and quite a bit of the stuff was published. ... " He also provided artwork for the Boys Club of America, and attended the Art Students League of New York, studying life drawing.

Career

Early career
As did many early comics professionals, Cardy entered the comics field working for Eisner & Iger, a company founded by Will Eisner and Jerry Iger, that was one of a handful of comic book "packagers" creating comics on demand for publishers testing the waters of the emerging medium. Joining the studio circa 1940, he worked on Fight Comics, Jungle Comics, Kaanga Comics, and Wings for Fiction House Publications. He wrote and drew the four-page backup feature "Lady Luck" in Will Eisner's 16-page, newspaper Sunday-supplement comic book colloquially called "The Spirit Section", from the May 18, 1941 strip through February 22, 1942. Though his Lady Luck stories were credited under the house pseudonym Ford Davis, Viscardi would subtly work in the initials "NV" somewhere into each tale. He used both his birth name and the pen name "Nick Cardy" concurrently for a time, he eventually adopted Nick Cardy for his comic-book work.

Cardy recalled of his start at Eisner & Iger that he worked alongside

Military and return to civilian life
Cardy did World War II military service from 1943 to 1945, earning two Purple Hearts for wounds suffered as a tank driver in the armored cavalry. He began his Army career with the 66th Infantry Division, during which time he won a competition to design its patch, creating its snarling black panther logo. His art talent led to his being assigned an office job at division headquarters. This lasted, Cardy recalled in an interview, because a general who had seen Cardy's cartoons in an Officers Club had Cardy assigned to his own corps. As the artist tells it, the only opening was for a corporal in the motor pool, so Private Cardy was promoted and assigned to that duty. This, he said, led in turn, upon his being shipped to the European theater, to Cardy's assignment as an assistant tank driver for the Third Armored Division, under General Courtney Hodges. Later, between the end of the war and his discharge, Cardy said he worked for the Army's Information and Education office in France. Cardy documented his time in the military in a series of intricate sketches and watercolors.

Back in civilian life, Cardy begin doing advertising art as well as covers for crossword puzzle magazines and other periodicals. In 1950, he began drawing the black-and-white daily Tarzan comic strip of writer-artist Burne Hogarth. From 1952 to 1953, Cardy assisted Warren Tufts on Tufts' comic strip Casey Ruggles.

DC Comics

In 1950, Cardy began his decades-long association with DC Comics, starting with the comic book Gang Busters, based on the dramatic radio show. He began developing his breakout reputation with  Tomahawk, his most prominent series at the time, which starred a white American colonist fighting the British undercover as an Iroquois Indian during the American Revolutionary War.

From 1962 to 1968, he drew the first 39 issues of Aquaman, whose character had previously starred in a backup feature in Adventure Comics, and all its covers through the final issue (#56, April 1971). He recalled that, "Ramona Fradon had been drawing the character but was moving on for some reason. I remember being in [editor] Murray's [Boltinoff] office with Ramona during the transition. ... Anyway, they must have liked my work because when the character got his own series, they made me the artist". Among the Aquaman stories which Cardy drew were issue #18 which featured the wedding of Aquaman and Mera and #23 which saw the birth of the couple's son. Aquagirl was introduced in issue #33 (June 1967) by Cardy and writer Bob Haney.

Cardy first drew the Teen Titans in The Brave and the Bold #60 (July 1965), wherein the superhero sidekicks Robin, Kid Flash, and Aqualad were joined by Wonder Woman's younger sister Wonder Girl in her first appearance. After next being featured in Showcase #59 (Dec. 1965), the team was spun off into their own series with Teen Titans #1 (Feb. 1966). From 1966 to 1973, Cardy penciled or inked – sometimes both – all 43 issues of the series. Neal Adams was called upon to rewrite and redraw a Cardy-drawn Teen Titans story which had been written by Len Wein and Marv Wolfman. The story, titled "Titans Fit the Battle of Jericho!", would have introduced DC's first African American superhero but was rejected by publisher Carmine Infantino. The revised story appeared in Teen Titans #20 (March–April 1969). New members of the team, psychic Lilith Clay and Mal Duncan, were created by Cardy and writer Robert Kanigher. In 1968–69, Cardy drew the fondly remembered but short-lived, quirky Western series Bat Lash, about an expert gunslinger who was nonetheless a dandy, and who, in a nod to the 1960s counterculture, wore a flower in his hat. Cardy during this time also assisted artist Al Plastino, a childhood friend, on the Batman comic strip.

Cardy became the primary DC cover artist from the early to mid-1970s.

A popular but apocryphal anecdote, told by DC editor Julius Schwartz, concerned Cardy being fired by DC editorial director Carmine Infantino for not following a cover layout, only to be rehired moments later when Schwartz praised the errant cover art. Cardy said in 2005,
{{blockquote|[A]t one of the conventions ... I said, 'You know, Carmine, Julie Schwartz wrote something in [his autobiography] that I don't remember at all and it doesn't sound like you at all'. And I told him the incident ... and he said, 'That's crazy. You know I always loved your work. Gee, you were one of the best artists in the business. The guy's crazy'. So I said, 'Okay, come on'. We went over to Julie Schwartz's table and we told him what our problem was. And Carmine and I said, 'We don't remember the incident'. So Julie said, 'Well, it's a good story, anyway'. [laughs] And that was it. He let it go at that. [laughs] He just made it up."}}

Later career
Cardy left the comics industry in the mid-1970s for the more lucrative field of commercial art. There, under the name Nick Cardi, he did magazine art and ad illustrations, including movie advertising art (though not necessarily the "one-sheet" posters) for films including The Street Fighter (1974), The Night They Robbed Big Bertha's (1975), Neil Simon's California Suite (1978), Stanley Donen's Movie Movie (1978), Martin Ritt's Casey's Shadow (1978), and Francis Ford Coppola's Apocalypse Now (1979).

In 1996, Cardy was one of the many creators who contributed to the Superman: The Wedding Album one-shot wherein the title character married Lois Lane. Other late-career comics work included a one-page illustration for Wonder Woman vol. 2 #120 (April 1997), the cover of Silver Age: Teen Titans #1 (July 2000), two pages for Titans #25 (March 2001), and the cover of Teen Titans Lost Annual #1 (March 2008).

Personal life
Following his World War II discharge from the U.S. Army, Cardy met and married Ruth Houghby. In 1955 they had a son, Peter, who died in 2001. The couple remained married through 1969. Cardy died of congestive heart failure in Florida on November 3, 2013.

Awards
Nick Cardy received an Inkpot Award in 1998. On July 15, 2005, Cardy was one of four professionals inducted that year into the comics industry's Will Eisner Comic Book Hall of Fame.

Viscardi also earned two Purple Hearts for wounds suffered as a tank driver while serving with the 3rd Armored Division in WWII. He also designed the patch for the 66th Infantry Division after winning a competition.

Bibliography
Interior work
DC Comics

 Action Comics #229–232 (Congo Bill) (1957)
 The Adventures of Alan Ladd #1, 4–7 (1949–1950)
 Aquaman #1–39 (1962–1968)
 Bat Lash #1–7 (1968–1969)
 Batman #80 (1953)
 The Brave and the Bold #91–92, 94–97, 99 (1970–1971)
 Challengers of the Unknown #71 (1969)
 Congo Bill #1–7 (1954–1955)
 Detective Comics #293–296, 298–300 (Aquaman); #430 (Batman) (1961–1972)
 Falling in Love #79, 95 (1965–1967)
 Gang Busters #6–8, 10, 13–16, 20–21, 23, 38, 41, 56, 61–62, 65, 67 (1948–1958)
 Ghosts #4 (1972)
 Girls' Love Stories #130 (1967)
 House of Mystery #19–22, 28, 57, 60, 63–64, 71–72, 76, 78–80, 84, 87, 92–94, 96–97, 107–108, 111, 128–129, 198 (1953–1972)
 House of Secrets #2, 6, 10–11, 14, 16, 19, 24, 26, 29, 40, 113 (1957–1973)
 Legends of Daniel Boone #1–8 (1955–1956)
 Mr. District Attorney #5, 14 (1948–1950)
 My Greatest Adventure #3, 12–13, 15, 17, 22, 24, 26, 29–31, 34–35, 39, 43–49, 51 (1955–1961)
 Phantom Stranger #5 (1970)
 Plop! #2 (1973)
 Rip Hunter ... Time Master #4–5 (1961)
 Secret Hearts #145 (1970)
 Showcase #31–33 (Aquaman); #59 (Teen Titans); #76 (Bat Lash) (1961–1968)
 Strange Adventures #167 (1964)
 Superman: The Wedding Album (among other artists) (1996)
 Tales of the Unexpected #7, 11–13, 18–20, 26–27, 30, 33, 38–39, 41, 43, 45, 47, 52–55, 58 (1956–1961)
 Teen Titans #1–17, 20–43 (1966–1973)
 Titans #25 (among other artists) (2001)
 Tomahawk #138 (1972)
 The Unexpected #165 (1975)
 The Witching Hour #8 (1970)
 Wonder Woman vol. 2 #120 (one page only) (1997)
 World's Finest Comics #68–72, 87 (Tomahawk); 125–126 (Aquaman) (1954–1962)
 Young Romance #173 (1971)

Eclipse Comics
 True Love #1–2 (1986)

NL Communications, Inc.
 National Lampoon #54 (1974)

Quality Comics
 Crack Comics #7–8 (1940)
 Feature Comics #32, 40–42 (1940–1941)
 Hit Comics #5–11 (1940–1941)
 National Comics #6–12, 14–20 (1940–1942)

Standard Comics
 Adventures in the Unknown #7 (1952)
 Adventures into Darkness #5, 11 (1953)
 Intimate Love #20 (1952)
 Lost World #5 (1952)
 New Romances #13 (1952)

Cover work
DC Comics

 Action Comics #409–418, 420–445 (1972–1975)
 Aquaman #1–56 (1962–1971)
 Bat Lash #1–7 (1968–1969)
 Bat Lash: Guns & Roses trade paperback (2009)
 Batman #208, 247, 252, 254–261 (1969–1975)
 The Brave and the Bold #60, 91–92, 94, 96–98, 100–104, 110 (1965–1973)
 Challengers of the Unknown #71, 73, 80 (1969–1973)
 Congo Bill #1–7 (1954–1955)
 Dark Mansion of Forbidden Love  #4 (1972)
 DC Special #3, 10 (1969–1971)
 DC 100 Page Super Spectacular #DC–4, DC–11, DC–12, DC–14, DC–15, DC–17, DC–18, DC–19, DC–20, DC–21, DC–22 (1971–1973)
 Detective Comics #429, 436 (1972–1973)
 Falling in Love #79, 112–113, 117, 119–120, 137 (1965–1972)
 The Flash #214, 216–219, 221, 222–232 (1972–1975)
 Forbidden Tales of Dark Mansion #5, 10, 12, 14–15 (1972–1974)
 From Beyond the Unknown #20–21, 23–25 (1972–1973)
 Gang Busters #15–16, 18 (1950–1951)
 Ghosts #1–6, 8–36 (1971–1975)
 Girls' Love Stories #139, 143, 145, 148, 151, 166 (1968–1971)
 Girls' Romances #120, 144, 147–148, 153–154 (1966–1971)
 Heart Throbs #121–122, 138 (1969–1972)
 House of Mystery #93, 171, 174, 198, 208, 220 (1959–1973)
 House of Secrets #6, 95, 104, 109, 111, 113–114 (1957–1973)
 Justice League of America #99–104, 106–116 (1972–1975)
 The Legend of Daniel Boone #1–8 (1955–1956)
 Legion of Super-Heroes #1–2 (1973)
 Limited Collectors' Edition #C–23, C–32, C–34 (1973–1975)
 My Greatest Adventure #24, 26 (1958)
 Phantom Stranger #27–28 (1973–1974)
 Rip Hunter ... Time Master #4–6 (1961–1962)
 Secrets of Sinister House #5, 8, 10, 13, 16–18 (1972–1974)
 Secret Origins #1–7 (1973–74)
 Secret Six #2 (1968)
 Shazam! #1 (1973)
 Showcase #32, 59, 76 (1961–1968)
 Silver Age: Teen Titans #1 (2000)
 Spectre #8–10 (1969)
 Spirit #31 (2009)
 Strange Adventures #239, 241, 243 (1972–1973)
 Strange Sports Stories #1–6 (1973–1974)
 Super DC Giant #S–17 (1970)
 Superboy #182–198, 200–206 (1972–1975)
 Superman #253–262, 264–285 (1972–1975)
 The Superman Family #164–169 (1974–1975)
 Superman's Pal, Jimmy Olsen #154–163 (1972–1974)
 Tales of the Unexpected #20 (1957)
 Teen Titans #1–43 (1966–1973)
 Teen Titans Annual #1 (1999)
 Teen Titans Lost Annual #1 (2008)
 Tomahawk #20–21, 24–27, 31–32, 36–37, 120 (1953–1969)
 The Unexpected #111, 116–117, 119–120, 123, 125–139, 141–162 (1969–1975)
 Wanted, the Most Dangerous Villains #2, 4–9 (1972–1973)
 Weird Mystery Tales #3, 7 (1972–1973)
 Weird War Tales #9–11 (1972–1973)
 Weird Western Tales #16 (1972)
 Weird Worlds #9 (1974)
 The Witching Hour #1–6, 11–12, 15–16, 18–52, 60 (1969–1975)
 Wonder Woman #205–206, 211, 216 (1973–1975)
 World's Finest Comics #212–228 (1972–1975)
 Young Love #74, 107 (1969–1974)
 Young Romance #157, 163, 187 (1968–1972)

Marvel Comics
 Crazy Magazine #7–8, 10, 12–13, 15–16 (1974–1976)
 Deadly Hands of Kung Fu #15, 18 (1975)
 Marvel Movie Premiere #1 (The Land That Time Forgot adaptation) (1975)
 Marvel Premiere #28 (Legion of Monsters) (1976)

References

Further reading
 The Art of Nick Cardy (Coates Publishing, 1999) ; reissued as Coates, John, with Nick Cardy (Vanguard Productions, 2001) 
 Nick Cardy: Comic Strips, Menard, Sean, and Nick Cardy (Frecklebean Publications, 2006) (self-published)
 Nolen-Weathington, Eric, with Nick Cardy, Nick Cardy: Behind The Art (TwoMorrows Publishing, 2008)
 Comic Book Marketplace Vol. 2, #48 (June 1997), pp. 20–27, 44–51, Gemstone Publishing
 Alter Ego'' #65 (2007)
 Witterstaetter, Renee, and Nick Cardy, "Nick Cardy: The Artist At War." (Little Eva Ink Publishing – 2011) . Reissued Titan Books, 2013. .

External links

 The Official Nick Cardy Website. Archived from the original on September 9, 2010.
 
 
 Nick Cardy at Mike's Amazing World of Comics
 Evanier, Mark. Transcript excerpt, 1998 Comic-Con International Nick Cardy panel, part 1, POV Online, column of March 2, 2001. WebCitation archive and part 2. WebCitation archive.

1920 births
2013 deaths
Advertising artists and illustrators
American comics artists
United States Army personnel of World War II
Art Students League of New York alumni
Charlton Comics
DC Comics people
Film poster artists
Golden Age comics creators
Inkpot Award winners
Silver Age comics creators
United States Army soldiers
Will Eisner Award Hall of Fame inductees